Dame Sarah Elisabeth Mullally,  (née Bowser; born 26 March 1962) is a British Anglican bishop, Lord Spiritual and former nurse. She has been Bishop of London since 8 March 2018.  She is the first woman to hold this position. From 1999 to 2004, she was England's Chief Nursing Officer and the National Health Service's director of patient experience for England; from July 2015 until 2018, she was Bishop of Crediton, a suffragan bishop in the Diocese of Exeter.

Early life and education
Mullally was born Sarah Elisabeth Bowser on 26 March 1962, the younger of two daughters. She was educated at Winston Churchill Comprehensive School, Woking, Surrey, and at Woking Sixth Form College. While studying for A levels she decided to become a nurse rather than a doctor because she wanted to apply a holistic approach to patient care. Her choice of career was also motivated by her Christian faith, which she has held since the age of 16.

In 1980, she began a nursing degree at South Bank Polytechnic, with clinical placements at St Thomas' Hospital, and was awarded joint Registered General Nurse (RGN) status and a Bachelor of Science (BSc) degree in 1984. In 1992, she completed a Master of Science (MSc) degree in inter-professional health and welfare studies at London South Bank University.

Nursing career
Mullally held clinical nursing posts at St Thomas' Hospital and The Royal Marsden Hospital (where she completed their specialist nursing course). She held a number of nursing leadership roles, firstly at the former Westminster Hospital (where she was a ward sister and head of practice development) and then as director of nursing at the Chelsea and Westminster later becoming deputy and acting chief executive officer. In 1999 she was appointed as Chief Nursing Officer and director of patient experience for England. She was the youngest person to hold these positions. She has been a non-executive director of the English Board of Nursing, Midwifery and Health Visiting.

Mullally was an independent governor for London South Bank University between 2005 and 2015, where she became vice-chair of the board of governors and chair of the policy and resources committee. She was a non-executive director of the Royal Marsden NHS Foundation Trust from 2005 to 2012, and held a non-executive role at Salisbury NHS Foundation between 2012 and 2016. Mullally became a lay member of the Council of King's College London in 2016.

Ordained ministry
From 1998 to 2001, Mullally undertook training for ordained ministry at the South East Institute of Theological Education (now St Augustine's College of Theology). She also studied theology at the University of Kent during this period, completing a Diploma in Theology (DipTh) in 2001. She was ordained in the Church of England: made a deacon at Michaelmas 2001 (30 September) at Southwark Cathedral and ordained a priest the following Michaelmas (5 October 2002) at Holy Trinity, Clapham — both times by Tom Butler, Bishop of Southwark. From 2001 to 2004, she served her curacy as a non-stipendiary minister (i.e. a part-time minister) at the Parish of Battersea Fields in the Diocese of Southwark.

In 2004, Mullally left her position as Chief Nursing Officer to pursue full-time ministry. She then served as an assistant curate at St Saviour's Church, Battersea Fields from 2004 to 2006. She completed a Master of Arts (MA) degree in pastoral theology at Heythrop College, University of London in 2006. In 2006, she became the team rector of Sutton team ministry at St Nicholas Church, Sutton, London. In addition to her parish work, she taught ethics in the Diocese of Southwark, was involved in an Anglican clergy leadership programme and sat on the Church of England's dioceses commission. From 2012 to 2015, she was the canon treasurer at Salisbury Cathedral in the Diocese of Salisbury.

Episcopal ministry
In June 2015, it was announced that Mullally would be the next bishop of Crediton, a suffragan bishop in the Diocese of Exeter. On 22 July 2015, she was consecrated a bishop by Justin Welby, the archbishop of Canterbury, during a ceremony at Canterbury Cathedral. She and Rachel Treweek were the first women to be ordained as bishops in Canterbury Cathedral. In September 2015, she became the first woman in the Church of England to lead an ordination service, ordaining two deacons, Leisa McGovern and Sheila Walker, as priests in St Mary's Church, Ottery St Mary, Devon.

On 18 December 2017, it was announced that she would be the next bishop of London, succeeding Richard Chartres who retired in February 2017. As Bishop of London, she is the third most senior bishop in the Church of England, after the archbishops of Canterbury and York. Between her confirmation and her installation, she was licensed as an honorary assistant bishop in the Diocese of Exeter, so that she was able to carry out engagements related to her former see. She was duly elected to the see by the College of Canons of St Paul's Cathedral on 25 January 2018, becoming bishop-elect. She was translated and took full legal possession of the see at the confirmation of her election — on 8 March at St Mary-le-Bow — and assumed full duties upon her installation at St Paul's on 12 May. On 15 July 2020, she acted as principal consecrator at the consecration of Hugh Nelson and Ruth Bushyager to the episcopate: this is a break in tradition with the Archbishop of Canterbury usually taking this role, and was the first time a female bishop had led a consecration service in the Church of England.

Mullally was sworn as a member of the Privy Council of the United Kingdom on 14 March 2018. She sits as a Lord Spiritual in the House of Lords. Her introduction in the House of Lords was held on 24 May 2018. She succeeded Lord Chartres and became the first female Dean of the Chapel Royal on 12 July 2019.

Views
Mullally is a self-described feminist and will ordain both men and women to the priesthood. According to the Financial Times, Mullally "is seen as a theological liberal." However, she also supports the inclusion in the Church of England of those who reject the ordination of women, stating upon her announcement as the next bishop of London; "I am very respectful of those who, for theological reasons, cannot accept my role as a priest or a bishop. My belief is that Church diversity throughout London should flourish and grow; everybody should be able to find a spiritual home."

Mullally supports the Church of England's current teaching on marriage; that is between one man and one woman for life. In September 2016, she became one of 10 bishops to make up the church's "Bishops' reflection group on sexuality". In relation to same-sex relationships, she stated in 2017 that "It is a time for us to reflect on our tradition and scripture, and together say how we can offer a response that is about it being inclusive love." When asked about LGBT people in the church, she further said that "What we have to remember is this is about people, and the church seeks to demonstrate love to all, because it reflects the God of love, who loves everybody." In 2022, Mullally supported the observance of LGBT+ History Month and the launch of an Advisory Group aimed at advising the Diocese on "pastoral care and inclusion of LGBT+ people in the life of our church communities."

Mullally has described her views on abortion as favouring abortion rights although she would lean against abortion faced with her own decision. She has said that "I would suspect that I would describe my approach to this issue as pro-choice rather than pro life although if it were a continuum I would be somewhere along it moving towards pro-life when it relates to my choice and then enabling choice when it related to others."

Personal life
In 1987, she married Eamonn Mullally; the couple have a daughter and a son.

Following her appointment as Bishop of London, Mullally moved into the Old Deanery at St Paul's. Mullally has stated that she had alterations made to the property, including the construction of an oratory in a former laundry room in which she prays the rosary and other Marian devotions and presides at weekly eucharistic adorations.

Mullally has stated that she has dyslexia, and finds it difficult to read out biblical genealogies.

Honours
In the 2005 New Year Honours, Mullally was appointed Dame Commander of the Order of the British Empire (DBE) in recognition for her contribution to nursing and midwifery. Though British clergy who are made knights do not receive the accolade (dubbing with a sword) and therefore male clergy do not use the title Sir, dames are not dubbed and so female clergy are free to use the title Dame. However, it is her choice as to whether she is referred to as "Dame Sarah" and the title was often omitted when announcing her as the next bishop of London in 2017.

Mullally has received academic honours. She was made a fellow of London South Bank University in 2001, and a fellow of Canterbury Christ Church University in 2006. She has received honorary doctorates from Bournemouth University (2004), the University of Wolverhampton (2004), and the University of Hertfordshire (2005).

Styles 

 Miss Sarah Bowser (1962–1987)
 Mrs Sarah Mullally (1987–2001)
 The Revd Sarah Mullally (2001–2005)
 The Revd Dame Sarah Mullally DBE (2005–2012)
 The Revd Canon Dame Sarah Mullally DBE (2012–2015)
 The Rt Revd Dame Sarah Mullally DBE (2015–2018)
 The Rt Revd and Rt Hon Dame Sarah Mullally DBE, Lord Bishop of London (2018–present)

References

External links
 Profile of Sarah Mullally on BBC Radio 4
 

1962 births
Living people
21st-century Church of England bishops
Alumni of London South Bank University
Women Anglican bishops
Bishops of Crediton
Bishops of London
Deans of the Chapel Royal
Nurses from London
British nursing administrators
Christianity in London
Dames Commander of the Order of the British Empire
Lords Spiritual
People from Woking
People with dyslexia
Members of the Privy Council of the United Kingdom
Christian feminist theologians
British feminists
NHS Chief Professional Officers